This article contains information about the literary events and publications of 1554.

Events
January 25 – Missionary, writer and poet José de Anchieta is one of the founders of the city of São Paulo, Brazil.
unknown date – Publication of Menno Simons'  begins the Dutch Golden Age of literature.

New books

Prose
Matteo Bandello
Novelle
Prima Parte
Edmund Bonner – Profitable and Necessary Doctryne
Charles Estienne – Praedium Rusticum
Johannes Magnus – Historia de omnibus gothorum sueonumque regibus (History of all Kings of Goths and Swedes)
Tepetlaoztoc Codex
Lazarillo de Tormes (anonymous)
Adrianus Turnebus's edition of Corpus Hermeticum
Approximate year:
Título de Totonicapán (anonymous Kʼicheʼ language document)

Poetry
Anacreontea (Greek poems of 1st century BC – 6th century AD, published for first time by Henri Estienne)

Births
October 20 – Bálint Balassi, Hungarian poet (died 1594)
November 11 – Luis de la Puente, Spanish theologian (died 1624)
November 30 – Sir Philip Sidney, English soldier and poet (died 1586)
Unknown date – Anrakuan Sakuden, Japanese poet (died 1642)
probable – Sir Walter Raleigh, writer, poet, soldier, courtier, spy, and explorer (died 1618)

Deaths
January 16 – Christiern Pedersen, Danish scholar, writer and printer (born c. 1480)
April 23 – Gaspara Stampa, Italian poet (born 1523)
June 24 – Feliciano de Silva, Spanish writer (born c. 1491)
September 8 – Johann Wild, German Bible commentator (born 1497)

References

Years of the 16th century in literature